Ruby McCollum, born Ruby Jackson (August 31, 1909 – May 23, 1992), was a wealthy married African-American woman in Live Oak, Florida, who is known for being arrested and convicted in 1952 for killing Dr. C. Leroy Adams, a prominent white doctor and state senator–elect. The judge restricted her testimony, but she testified as to their sexual relationship and his paternity of her child. The judge prohibited her from recounting her allegations that Adams had repeatedly raped her, and forced her to bear his children. She was sentenced to death for his murder by an all-white jury. The sensational case was covered widely in the United States press (including a press report written by Zora Neale Hurston, as well as by international papers). McCollum was subjected to a gag order. Her case was appealed and overturned by the State Supreme Court.

Before the second trial, McCollum was examined and found mentally incompetent to stand trial. She was committed to the state mental hospital (Florida State Hospital) at Chattahoochee, Florida. In 1974 her attorney, Frank Cannon, obtained her release under the Baker Act, as she was not considered a danger to herself or others.

In the 21st century, McCollum and her case received renewed attention, with books and four film documentaries exploring the issues of race, class, sexual violence, gender, and corruption in local politics from a modernist perspective. McCollum's case is considered a landmark trial by these people in the struggle for civil rights as they believe she was the first black woman to testify against a white man's sexual abuse and paternity of their child. It is considered to have helped change attitudes about the practice of "paramour rights”. McCollum's attorney, Releford McGriff, became part of a team who worked to change Florida's Jim Crow practice of selecting all-white juries. (Black people were still disenfranchised at that time and thus not eligible to serve as jurors, who were limited to voters.)

Early life
Ruby Jackson was born in 1909 to Gertrude and William Jackson in Zuber, Florida. She was the second child and first daughter among her six siblings. They attended local segregated schools. Ruby's parents recognized her intelligence and sent her to a private school, Fessenden Academy, where she excelled in bookkeeping.

Marriage and family
In 1931 Ruby Jackson married Sam McCollum. They moved to Nyack, New York, as part of the Great Migration of rural blacks out of the South in the early 20th century. The couple had three children together: Sam Jr., Sonja, and Kay. McCollum later said that a fourth and youngest, Loretta, was a biracial child fathered by Dr. C. Leroy Adams in a forced relationship.

Business activities
In 1934, the couple relocated to the area of Fort Myers, Florida. Sam's brother, Buck McCollum, had gained considerable wealth managing a Bolita gambling business. Sam went into business with him and was reported to be a player in North Florida crime, including gambling and liquor sales. These were illegal in the county, but flourished because of payoffs to local law enforcement. In a related sideline, the McCollums also sold burial policies and owned a local funeral home. By the 1940s and early 1950s, the McCollums were reported to have "amassed a fortune." based on their criminal activities.

Sam and Ruby owned a "stately, two-story home," in Live Oak, Florida, a small town of 4,000 people, which they acquired from the prior bolita operator in the county when he was run out of town. Ruby McCollum drove a new Chrysler automobile each year. The McCollums owned several "jooks" (juke joint), served illegal liquor, collected money from the juke boxes, and had a farm outside of town with the largest tobacco allotment in Florida. It was at this time that Ruby developed an addiction to heroin. The McCollums also owned a farm near Lake City, where Sam stocked fields with quail for hunting with his prized bird dogs.

Ruby McCollum was described as the wealthiest Black woman in town.The couple was considered financially successful and well respected in the community, where they contributed liberally to their church. Their son and oldest child, Sam Jr., had started college at UCLA (University of California at Los Angeles) by 1952.

Background
Florida was a segregated state where Black people had been essentially disenfranchised since the turn of the century amid passage of a constitution and laws imposing poll taxes, literacy tests, and other barriers to voter registration and Black voting. The exclusion from voting meant that African-Americans could not serve on juries, and they were generally excluded from any political office. The White Democrat-dominated state legislature following Reconstruction had passed laws to create legal segregation and Jim Crow. African-Americans were kept in second-class status until passage in the mid-1960s of civil rights legislation following their decades of activism and support from the national Democratic Party led by President Lyndon Johnson.

The power relations of many White men taking sexual advantage of Black women had a long history dating to slavery times, when enslaved women were frequently raped by White slaveholders.

From the late 17th century, Virginia and other colonies established laws that children of enslaved mothers were also born into slavery, regardless of their paternity, under the principle of partus sequitur ventrem. An assumption that powerful White men could take Black women as sexual partners, regardless of the women's desire or social status, continued to underlie many 20th century relations. This was called "paramour rights" at the time of the trial.

Dr. C. Leroy Adams had a reputation as a "benevolent and popular doctor who administered to the needy." In 1952 he was elected to the state senate. His associate, Dr. Dillard Workman, campaigned for him. Adams was considered to have a potential political future as Governor. Workman was Ruby McCollum's physician when she was pregnant with Adams' child. He performed the autopsy on Adams and testified to McCollum's sanity during her trial.

It was discovered after his death that Adams had forged his way into medical school and had falsified information regarding tenants at his farm to receive more government funding.

Shooting of Dr. C. Leroy Adams
Ruby McCollum met Dr. C. Leroy Adams, a white physician and state senator-elect, in his office in Live Oak, Florida. She had driven there with her two young children. She later admitted that she shot him four times with a revolver, and said it was because he would not agree to leave her alone. She said that over a period of years, he had repeatedly forced her to submit to sex and to bear his child. She claimed that her two-year-old daughter, Loretta, was fathered by him.

In notes and letters, McCollum said that Adams had abused her, and that she was pregnant with another child by him when she killed him. She also said that Adams took part in her husband Sam's "illegal gambling operation." An employee at the doctor's office later described seeing the doctor accept "large deliveries of cash in examination rooms."

Shortly before Adams' murder, The Suwannee Democrat began threatening to release information on Sam McCollum’s gambling ring, which put stress on Ruby and caused her to enter Brewster, an African-American hospital in Jacksonville. At that time, Dr. Adams also began treating Ruby for stress, possibly with daily injections of a sedative.

She would be readmitted to Brewster a few more times, both when Dr. Adams’ son died; and when Dr. Adams won the primary race for the state senate. It is unknown if these two events were the reasons behind her additional admittances to Brewster.

McCollum was arrested and taken to the state prison 50 miles away. This was temporary and for her protection, according to contemporary accounts. Given what is known, the purpose of sending her so far from her home could vary.

It is said that the day after her arrest, her husband Sam died of a heart attack in Zuber, Florida. He had taken their children there for safekeeping with Ruby's mother.

However, the local undertaker at the time, Charles Hall, has stated that Sam "knew his life was over" when his wife shot Adams, and he purposely overdosed on his heart medication after knowing his kids were safe with Ruby's mother.

First trial
McCollum was defended by Frank Cannon, a District Attorney from Jacksonville, Florida. The case was prosecuted by state's attorney Keith Black, and presided over by Florida's Third Circuit Court judge, Judge Hal W. Adams. (He was not related to the doctor, but had been an honorary pallbearer at his funeral). It was an all-white jury, some of whom had been Dr. Adams' patients. (As blacks were disenfranchised and generally not registered to vote, they did not qualify for the jury pool.) Zora Neale Hurston, a black anthropologist and writer on assignment from the Pittsburgh Courier, was the first person to report on the trial for a newspaper outside Florida. She was required to sit upstairs in the segregated gallery of the courtroom. Her coverage helped McCollum's case gain a national and international audience.

McCollum testified that Adams raped her in her home and in his office (located immediately across the street from the courthouse), and that he insisted that she bear his child. The court prevented her defense attorney from presenting more complete information about their relationship. All of Cannon's efforts to introduce the doctor's pattern of repeated physical abuse of her at the office were objected to by the prosecutor and upheld by the judge. She was allowed to testify only to events on the day of the murder. She said that Adams had struck her repeatedly that day and they struggled. Essentially McCollum was silenced in court regarding additional testimony that would have established mitigating circumstances.

According to Zora Neale Hurston, who reported on the trial for the Pittsburgh Courier:
Ruby was allowed to describe how, about 1948, during an extended absence of her husband, she had, in her home, succumbed to the sexual assault. She was allowed to state that her youngest child was his. Yet thirty-eight times Frank Cannon attempted to proceed from this point; thirty-eight times he attempted to create the opportunity for Ruby to tell her whole story and thus explain what were her motives; thirty-eight times the State objected; and thirty-eight times Judge Adams sustained these objections.

The judge also imposed a gag order on McCollum, preventing the press from interviewing her. This also prevented her attorneys from the opportunity to determine whether speaking with the press would aid her case.

Hurston writes that defense attorney Frank Cannon, frustrated by the court's upholding the state prosecuting attorney's objections to most of the evidence he tried to introduce about McCollum's relationship with Dr. Adams, turned to the judge and said, "May God forgive you, Judge Adams, for robbing a human being of life in such a fashion." While this is written by Hurston, and quoted by Huie, there is no record of the statement in the trial transcript. Hurston reported that Thelma Curry, a witness, was told to leave the witness stand and go back where she belongs. This does not appear in the trial transcript.

The prosecuting attorney said that McCollum had shot Adams in anger over a disputed bill, an account supported by three witnesses during the trial. McCollum testified that she had discussed a bill with Adams that day, but maintained that she fired at the doctor in self-defense when he attacked her. The prosecution questioned this, pointing out that Adams was 100 pounds heavier than Ruby McCollum and all of the shots were fired into his back. Residents of Live Oak knew that McCollum was a wealthy woman, and she and her husband were known to pay their bills promptly.

McCollum was convicted by the jury of first degree murder on December 20, 1952. She was sentenced to death in the electric chair.

Her case was appealed. During the period before the appeal was decided, McCollum was held in the Suwannee County Jail.
Her conviction and death sentence were overturned on a technicality by the Florida Supreme Court on July 20, 1954. The court cited Judge Hal W. Adams, the presiding judge, for failing to be present at the jury's inspection of the scene of the crime.

Second trial
Concerned for her mental health, defense attorney Frank Cannon arranged for McCollum to be examined in the county jail, where she had been held for about two years. At the second trial, he entered a plea of insanity. Upon receiving the results of an examination of McCollum by court-appointed physicians, including Dr. Adams' associate Dr. Dillard Workman, the state attorney Randall Slaughter agreed to the plea.

McCollum was declared mentally incompetent to stand trial. She was committed to the Florida State Hospital for mental patients at Chattahoochee, Florida. She was held there until 1974, when her attorney, Frank Cannon, successfully filed for her release under Florida's recently enacted Baker Act. It allowed release of mental patients who were not judged to be a threat to themselves or the community.

Coverage
There was extensive coverage of the trial, but the judge put McCollum under a gag order. The press was never allowed to interview McCollum. Ellis, who remembers the trial in his hometown, emphasizes that this isolation of McCollum from the press was done less to cover up the affair between McCollum and Adams, which was already making the gossip circuits of the town, than it was to conceal the illegal dealings between whites and blacks in the community related to gambling and liquor. The IRS was in town to collect taxes on unreported gambling and liquor sales. Ellis writes that this attempt to silence McCollum proved in the long run to be totally unsuccessful. Following his publication of the annotated transcript of the trial, McCollum and her case have been the subject of a number of books and documentaries published. 

The noted African-American writer Zora Neale Hurston covered the trial for the Pittsburgh Courier from the fall of 1952 through Ruby McCollum's conviction just before Christmas that year. She was forced to sit in the segregated second-floor gallery of the courtroom. From January–March 1953, the Courier published Hurston's series entitled, "The Life Story of Ruby McCollum".

Hurston, who was unable to attend the appeal or the second trial for financial reasons, contacted journalist William Bradford Huie to interest him in the case. They had worked together before and he had taken on controversial cases. She shared her notes from the first trial and corresponded with him to furnish additional information. She also asked for bus fare to attend the trial, but Huie did not respond.

Huie did investigate the story and, after attending the appeal and second trial, published Ruby McCollum: Woman in the Suwannee Jail (1956). This book became a bestseller. Huie asked his publisher not to distribute the book in Florida due to his continuing legal troubles there. Huie's book also addresses his effort to fight Judge Adams' gag order against the press. He filed a First Amendment challenge, claiming freedom of the press to speak to the defendant, but did not succeed in his suit.

At one point, Judge Adams charged Huie with contempt of court for attempting to influence Dr. Fernay, a witness scheduled to testify as to McCollum's sanity. The journalist served overnight in jail as a result of not paying a fine the judge had imposed in the contempt charge. During that period, Huie met the director, Elia Kazan. In 1960 they had discussions about Kazan's directing a film to be adapted from Huie's book and entitled The Ruby McCollum Story. While other films based on Huie's books were produced in the 1960s and later, none was made from his account of the Ruby McCollum story.

Huie says in his updated, fourth edition of his work (1964) that he was denied entrance to the Florida State Mental Hospital in Chattahoochee, Florida where Ruby McCollum was held. Jet Magazine reporters visited Ruby McCollum there in 1958 and published their interview with her. Huie never interviewed McCollum.

Later years and death
In 1974, attorney Frank Cannon, who was her primary attorney during her murder trial in 1952, visited McCollum in the mental hospital. Without asking for any legal fees, he filed legal papers to have her released under the Baker Act. This allowed mental patients who were considered not to be a danger to be released to their families.

McCollum lived after her release in a rest home in Silver Springs, Florida, funded by a trust set up by author William Bradford Huie. He had paid her $40,000 for the movie rights for a feature film which he hoped to have adapted from his book about the case, Ruby McCollum: Woman in the Suwannee Jail (1964, 4th edition).

McCollum was finally able to see her children again. Sam Jr. had been convicted in 1975 in federal court on 10 counts of gambling. He had been living in the McCollum homestead, from which the FBI confiscated $250,000. They later returned a good portion of it to him, after the IRS deducted appropriate taxes and penalties. McCollum's daughters Sonja and Kay both married and lived in Ocala, Florida. Kay (McCollum) Hope died in a car accident in 1978 and Sonja (McCollum) Wood died of a heart attack in 1979.

In November 1980, Al Lee of the Ocala Star Banner interviewed McCollum at the rest home in Silver Springs. Lee wrote that McCollum had no memory of her ordeal. He reported that psychiatrists said that she may have suffered Ganser syndrome, or the suppression of painful memories. In those years, the State Mental Hospital at Chattahoochee was investigated more than once over issues of patient treatment, overuse of medications including thorazine, and the administration of electroshock therapy, which can affect memory.]

There is no word on what became of Sam Jr., or Ruby's youngest daughter, Loretta.

On May 23, 1992, at 4:45 AM, McCollum died of a stroke at the New Horizon Rehabilitation Center, at the age of 82. Her brother, Matt Jackson, had died less than a year before. The family arranged for her to be buried beside her brother and his wife in the cemetery behind Hopewell Baptist Church in Live Oak. Her name was mistakenly spelled on her death certificate as "Ruby McCollumn".

Aftermath
The case has haunted people, in part because of Judge Adams's gag order. Some commentators said the silences were to keep quiet the fact that there had been some white participation in Sam McCollum's illegal bolita operations, source of untaxed money to help finance the participants’ businesses in town. As Judge Adams upheld prosecutor's objections during the trial, the defense attorney Cannon was prevented from introducing most of the evidence related to Adams' sexual abuse of McCollum. She was allowed, however, to testify to being forced to have Adams' baby. This was the first time that a black woman had testified to a white man's paternity of her child and other circumstances of her defense. This established the trial as a landmark case, since no other black woman who had shot and killed a white man had ever been allowed to testify in her own defense.

In the 21st century, new non-fiction and fiction books continue to be published about McCollum and the case.

C. Arthur Ellis, Jr. published a compiled and edited transcript of the trial in 2003, with a revised edition in 2007. His associated commentary describes the importance of this trial in the history of civil rights as the first time that an African-American woman testified in court against a white man to say that he had forced sex upon her, and testified to his paternity of their child. Until this time, Ellis claims, African-American women were afforded no protection under the law for rape by a white man.  Ellis said he published the transcript because many scholars had mistakenly said that McCollum did not testify at her trial; they had noted that the court upheld most of the objections of the prosecution to introducing testimony about the abusive relationship. A 2014 episode of the Investigation Discovery show A Crime to Remember, "The Shot Doctor," perpetuated this error.

In his annotated edition, Ellis explores the intertwining of personal and professional relationships among the figures prominent in the case and the trial. He noted that late 20th and early 21st-century professional standards related to conflict of interest would likely classify certain figures as having violated those standards. As an example, he notes that Dr. Dillard Workman was Adams' medical associate. He treated McCollum for her prenatal care of her child by Adams.  Workman had campaigned for Adams in his state senatorial race. He was commissioned to conduct Adams' autopsy and testified about it during the murder trial of his patient, McCollum, the defendant. In addition, at the second trial of McCollum, he testified as an expert witness as to her sanity. He would likely be considered today to be violating his obligation to her as his patient in these actions. In addition, the judge who presided over the trial was a pallbearer at Dr. Adams' funeral.

In 2006, Tammy Evans published The Silencing of Ruby McCollum: Race, Class, and Gender in the South through University Press of Florida. Reviewer Elizabeth Boyd writes, "The starkness of the crime was matched only by the evasiveness that characterized its aftermath, and it is this prevarication--this collective dissembling on the part of Live Oak folk, white and black--that is the true subject of the book." Evans focuses on the silencing of Ruby McCollum by the court placing a gag order on her and prohibiting her from speaking to the press. She said this freed whites to create a "cover story."

Ellis says that the town's silence towards "outsiders" was out of fear of the IRS, whose agents were scouring the town to uncover covert gambling revenues for which taxes went unpaid. Ellis also points out that the "cover story" of Ruby McCollum murdering Dr. Adams over a doctor bill resulted from McCollum and Adams arguing over a bill at the time of the murder. Witnesses of this alleged argument testified to its existence, leading to the assumption that the murder must have been simply because of an unpaid bill, when there was indeed far more at stake..

In 2015, Ellis published a book, Hall of Mirrors: Confirmation and Presentist Biases in Continuing Accounts of the Ruby McCollum Story. He explores the biases of filmmakers and academicians in their interpretations of McCollum's story. Ellis published, for the first time, the letters of Ruby McCollum, written from prison and the Florida State Mental Hospital, and the letters of Dr. Adams's nurse, Edith Park. Ellis notes that one of McCollum's letters to her attorneys speaks of her turning down an interview with a reporter from a Jacksonville newspaper who visited her in prison at Raiford. This had not been noted by other writers who cited Judge Adams's gag order. Ellis also cites reporters who spoke with residents of Live Oak at the time, dispelling the notion that the townspeople of Live Oak did not speak to any of them.<ref name="ReferenceA">Ellis, C. Arthur, Jr., Hall of Mirrors: Confirmation and Presentist Biases in Continuing Accounts of the Ruby McCollum Story, Gadfly Publishing, 2015</ref>

Representation in other media
In 1999, Thulani Davis wrote a play, Everybody's Ruby: Story of a Murder in Florida, which premiered in New York at the Joseph Papp Public Theatre, directed by Kenny Leon. It starred Viola Davis as McCollum and Phylicia Rashad as author Zora Neale Hurston. The play is described as highly artistic, but departing significantly from the historical facts.
In 2009, C. Arthur Ellis wrote a historical novel, Zora Hurston And The Strange Case Of Ruby McCollum, based on Hurston's articles for the Pittsburgh Courier and his own research for his non-fiction book on the trial. 
In 2010, "The Ballad of Ruby McCollum", a song performed by Peg and Chip Carbone, written by Peg and Chip Carbone and David Schmeling, was recorded at Reveal Audio - Atlanta. The Other Side of Silence is a 2012 documentary film about McCollum and her case by Dr. Claudia Hunter Johnson, a writer and teacher. (She was  nominated for a 1995 Pulitzer Prize for her memoir, Stifled Laughter.) The film contains an interview with A. K. Black, the prosecutor in the McCollum case. Johnson reported receiving a death threat while working on the film. The film was the official nominee at several film festivals in 2012.Curtain of Secrecy: The Story of Ruby McCollum (documentary) (2014), a feature-length documentary about Ruby McCollum, premiered in Jacksonville, Florida. It is produced by the Art Institute of that city, and directed by Ramona Ramdeen. She interviewed Dr. C. Arthur Ellis, Jr., the only living historian who personally knew all of the figures in the case.
In November 2014, '"The Shot Doctor", an episode in the A Crime to Remember series airing on Investigation Discovery, included historian, Dr. C. Arthur Ellis, Jr. The narrator mistakenly said that McCollum was not allowed to testify at her trial. Ellis correctly noted that she was allowed to testify that Adams forced sex upon her, that she bore his child. Other details her defense tried to introduce were prevented by the judge upholding prosecutor's objections.You Belong to Me: Sex, Race and Murder in the South (2015), a feature-length documentary about Ruby McCollum and her case, was released on video on demand and DVD, in conjunction with Black History Month and Women's History Month. The film was produced by Hilary Saltzman, Kitty Potapow, and Jude Hagin (former state film commissioner) through Hummingbird Film Productions, LLC. It was written and directed by John Cork. It was the first film for which members of the McCollum and Adams families spoke on the record about the case. The last surviving juror from the trial and others involved in case also participated in the film. 
C. Arthur Ellis, Jr. published a monograph, Hall of Mirrors: Confirmation and Presentist Biases in Continuing Accounts of the Ruby McCollum Story (2015). It explores how the events have been interpreted in print and film.

References

Bibliography

Diaz, John A. "Woman Chased by Mob After Slaying Doctor: Murder of White Medico Touches Off Powder Keg." (Pittsburgh Courier, August 16, 1952)
Ellis, C. Arthur (Jr.) and Leslie E. Ellis, The Trial of Ruby McCollum:  The True-crime Story That Shook the Foundations of the Segregationist South! 1st Book Library, 2003. .
Ellis, C. Arthur (Jr.), State of Florida vs. Ruby McCollum, Defendant (Morrisville, N.C.: Lulu Press, 2007). .
Evans, Tammy. The Silencing of Ruby McCollum: Race, Class, and Gender in the South (Gainesville, Fla.: University Press of Florida, 2006). .
Huie, William Bradford, Ruby McCollum: Woman in the Suwannee Jail (New York: E. P. Dutton, 1956). 2nd Edition (title change only): The Crime of Ruby McCollum. (London: Jarrolds Publishers, 1957). 3rd Edition: The Crime of Ruby McCollum. (London: Grey Arrow, 1959). Fourth Edition (revised and updated): Ruby McCollum: Woman in the Suwannee Jail. (New York: Signet Books, 1964).
Hurston, Zora Neale. Series of articles covering the trial: Pittsburgh Courier, October 1952-January 1953. Also, "The Life Story Of Ruby McCollum", Pittsburgh Courier, Jan-March 1953.

Fiction
Davis, Thulani. Everybody's Ruby (Samuel French, Inc., 2000, 79 pages), drama play, .
 Ellis, C. Arthur (Jr.). Zora Hurston And The Strange Case Of Ruby McCollum, historical novel based upon events. (Chattanooga, TN: Gadfly Publishing, 2009). .

Further reading
"Psychiatrists Report Woman Slayer Insane", Daytona Beach Morning Journal, September 24, 1954.
"Ruby McCollum's Fate Is Mulled", St. Petersburg Times, December 10, 1973.
"Woman may be freed in Fla. doctor's death", The Afro American, January 26, 1974.
"Judge strips 135G McCollum Estate", Baltimore Afro-American, March 31, 1953.

External links
Interview with C. Arthur Ellis, re: novel, Zora Hurston and The Strange Case of Ruby McCollum, NPR, available on YouTube, June 5, 2009
"A Guide to the Documents Relating to the Trial of Ruby McCollum for the Murder of Dr. LeRoy Adams, Live Oak, Florida, 1954", University of Florida Smathers Libraries
Ruby McCollum story movie rights, Ocala Star Banner''
Official website for the documentary, You Belong to Me: Sex, Race, and Murder in the South

African-American people
People from Marion County, Florida
American prisoners sentenced to death
Prisoners sentenced to death by Florida
People convicted of murder by Florida
1992 deaths
1909 births
People from Live Oak, Florida
People from Fort Myers, Florida
People from Nyack, New York
History of Suwannee County, Florida